It Happened Tomorrow is a 1944 American fantasy film directed by René Clair, starring Dick Powell, Linda Darnell and Jack Oakie, and featuring Edgar Kennedy and John Philliber. It is based on the one-act play "The Jest of Haha Laba" by Lord Dunsany.

Plot
In the 1890s, Lawrence Stevens (Dick Powell) is an obituary writer unhappy in his job, who is given, by an elderly newspaper man named Pop Benson (John Philliber), a newspaper that has tomorrow's news.  He uses the paper to write stories and get the scoop on other reporters; but this also brings him under suspicion by Police Inspector Mulrooney (Edgar Kennedy), who wants to know how Stevens came by his knowledge of a robbery at a theater's box office during a performance, of which he read in the newspaper provided by Benson. Stevens and his new girlfriend Sylvia (Linda Darnell) – half of a clairvoyant act with her uncle Oscar Smith (Jack Oakie) – have a number of adventures, until her uncle mistakenly thinks that Stevens has consorted with his niece in her boarding house room.  The uncle attempts to intimidate Stevens into marrying her, not knowing that Stevens has come to him to ask for her hand.

Stevens gets another newspaper from Pop Benson, intending to use it to pick horses at the racetrack, to win enough money  to get married.  Unfortunately, he also reads a story about his own death that night, so he and Sylvia get married immediately and head off to the track with her uncle.  Stevens bets on winner after winner, amassing $60,000, which is then stolen on their way back to town.  They give chase but are arrested for speeding. Stevens hopes for more help from Benson, but learns that the old man died two days ago, even before Stevens received the first newspaper.

Stevens tries his best to avoid the hotel lobby where his death is supposed to take place, but circumstances keep pushing him in that direction.  He spots the man who stole his money and chases him on foot through the streets and over the rooftops, until they both fall through the chimney that leads to the very hotel lobby he's been trying to avoid. A gunfight breaks out, and the thief is shot and killed.  Because he has Stevens' wallet on him, he is at first identified as the newspaperman, and his newspaper prints an erroneous story saying that their star reporter has been killed. When a reporter finds out the truth, the newspaper has already hit the streets; and it is this edition that he had gotten from Pop. 
 
Stevens does not die in the hotel lobby; he marries Sylvia and lives to celebrate their 50th wedding anniversary.

Cast 
 Dick Powell as Lawrence Stevens
 Linda Darnell as Sylvia Smith
 Jack Oakie as Uncle Oscar Smith
 Edgar Kennedy as Inspector Mulrooney
 John Philliber as Pop Benson
 Edward Brophy as Jake Schomberg, man taking bets at racetrack
 George Cleveland as Mr. Gordon, newspaper editor
 Sig Ruman as Mr. Beckstein, circus scout
 Paul Guilfoyle as Shep
 George Chandler as Bob
 Eddie Acuff as Jim
 Robert Dudley as Justice of the Peace

Production
Director and producer Frank Capra originally purchased the rights to Hugh Wedlock and Howard Snyder's story, but when he discovered the concept was similar to that in Lord Dunsany's 20-year-old one act play, he bought it as well; later, when he was going into the Army to serve in World War II, he sold both to Arnold Pressburger.  Pressburger approached Rene Clair about directing the film, and the two hired Clair's friend Dudley Nichols to assist in writing the script. They set the time period in the 1890s to avoid dealing with the war.

Clair initially wanted Cary Grant for the lead role, but wound up with Dick Powell, who was on the verge of altering his screen persona from a lightweight musical-comedy "juvenile" to a harder one, playing tough guy private detective Philip Marlowe in Murder My Sweet later that year, followed by a series of film noirs.

Although It Happened Tomorrow was far from Clair's favorite, he was later to write that "[t]he last twenty minutes are the best thing I did in Hollywood." The ending, especially, which hinges on a mistake in the newspaper from the future, had a personal connection for Clair, since he was fired from his first job as a reporter when he made up a story which was the opposite of what actually happened; Nichols was a former newsman as well.

Reception
It Happened Tomorrow was a success at the box office.  Film historian Jeff Stafford noted that the critical response in the United States was "complimentary but reserved". In France, however, the film was a "major critical success".

Awards and honors
It Happened Tomorrow was nominated for two Academy Awards:
 Best Music, Scoring of a Dramatic or Comedy Picture (Robert Stolz)
 Best Sound, Recording (Jack Whitney)

Adaptations
It Happened Tomorrow was adapted as a radio play for the July 3, 1944 episode of Lux Radio Theater with Don Ameche and Anne Baxter, the September 25, 1944 episode of The Screen Guild Theater with Dick Powell and Linda Darnell reprising their original roles and on the October 9, 1946 episode of Academy Award Theater, starring Eddie Bracken and Ann Blyth.

See also
 List of American films of 1944
 Communication from the future
 List of ghost films
 Early Edition

References

External links
 
 
 
 

1940 films
1940s fantasy comedy films
1940s historical films
American black-and-white films
American fantasy comedy films
American historical fantasy films
American romantic fantasy films
Adaptations of works by Lord Dunsany
1940s English-language films
Films about journalists
Films directed by René Clair
Films produced by Arnold Pressburger
Films set in the 1890s
Films with screenplays by Dudley Nichols
United Artists films
Films scored by Robert Stolz
1940s American films